Tangled is the soundtrack album to the 2010 computer-animated film of the same name produced by Walt Disney Animation Studios. The film score and original songs were composed by Alan Menken, which marked his return to composition for an animated feature, as he previously worked on several of Disney's animated features till Home on the Range (2004). The original songs were created by blending 1960s medieval music with folk rock. Glenn Slater wrote lyrics for most of the tracks in the album, except for the closing credits song "Something That I Want" was written, composed and performed by Grace Potter from Grace Potter and the Nocturnals. 

The soundtrack was released by Walt Disney Records on November 10, 2010, followed by a vinyl edition that was released on March 21, 2014. Apart from being critically acclaimed, the soundtrack received several awards and nominations, including the Grammy Award for Best Song Written for Visual Media for the track "I See the Light". Menken and Slater wrote three new songs for the series, apart from reusing the original tracks for the stage adaptation Tangled: The Musical.

Reception 
The soundtrack (particularly Menken's musical score) in general was technically praised, however the songs mostly received some mixed reactions for being quite derivative to most of Menken's previous works (particularly the 1990s renaissance ones). Bill Graham from Collider praised them for their variations to the tempo and tone, memorable lyrics, and "blending old with new," However, he also stated that "the film’s constant mixture of tones can feel a bit off-putting for some." Roth Cornet from Screen Rant was positive towards them, saying that "Alan Menken’s music is as catchy, uplifting and effecting as one would expect." Scott of The New York Times positively reviewed the music, saying that it "takes you back to a charmed world of swoony longing and sprightly mischief," with a slick and efficient atmosphere and grace notes of self-conscious classicism. Corliss from Time was also positive to the songs, noting that though "don't sound on first hearing like top-drawer Menken," the songs still "smoothly fill their functions." He described the opener, "When Will My Life Begin?," as the "heroine's 'I wanna' song," a Disney tradition that stretches back to Snow White's "Some Day My Prince Will Come." "I See the Light" was described as "a generically tuneful love ballad, which is sure to be nominated for a Best Song Oscar."

James Berardinelli, on the other hand, negatively commented the songs as "neither catchy nor memorable." Tim Robey from The Daily Telegraph gave a negative review, saying that they were only "OK—there’s nothing you want to whistle on the way home." Peter Bradshaw from The Guardian, who gave the movie two out of five stars, described the songs as "sporting a laboured selection of Broadway-style show tunes," and hence are actually added for profit.

Track listing

Charts

Certifications

Accolades

Notes

References 

2010 soundtrack albums
Disney animation soundtracks
Walt Disney Records soundtracks
Albums produced by Alan Menken
Alan Menken soundtracks
Grace Potter and the Nocturnals albums
Folk soundtracks
Rock soundtracks
Tangled (franchise)
Animated film soundtracks
Musical film soundtracks
Fantasy film soundtracks
Adventure film soundtracks
Comedy film soundtracks